Yel Cheshmeh or Yelcheshmeh may refer to:
 Yel Cheshmeh-ye Jadid
 Yel Cheshmeh-ye Olya
 Yel Cheshmeh-ye Sofla